Margaret Halstan (25 December 1879 – 8 January 1967) was a British stage, radio, television and film actress. In theatre and film roles she often played upper-class ladies of the gentry, with a career spanning over six decades. She was particularly known for her Shakespearian roles, having debuted in 1895, at the turn of the century she joined Sir Frank Benson theatre company, and also played in the theatrical company's of Sir George Alexander and Sir Herbert Beerbohm Tree, before making her debut in silent film in 1916.

Biography
She was born Clara Maud Hertz in Greater London in 1879, of apparently Jewish descentand later used the stage name Margaret Halstan. Her parents were Henry Anthony Hertz and his wife Elizabeth Maud.

Before becoming a professional actor, Halstan performed as an amateur with the Strolling Players and the Bancroft Amateur Dramatic Society. She performed in a show titled Beethoven's Romance at the Royalty Theatre on 1 December 1894. Halstan made her first professional stage appearance at the Haymarket Theatre on 30 October 1895, 
as a walk-on in Trilby. She was fluent in English, German, and French, and performed on stage in all three languages. Halstan also acted in BBC radio productions such as the 1938 radio adaptation of the novel If I Were You, and the 1940 radio adaptation of the short story "Lord Arthur Savile's Crime".

Halstan married lawyer John Hartman Morgan in 1905.

Theatre

Filmography

References 

British film actresses
British stage actresses
Place of birth missing
Place of death missing